Roman Lengyel (born 3 November 1978 in České Budějovice) is a Czech former professional footballer who played as a defender.

External links

Living people
1978 births
Sportspeople from České Budějovice
Association football defenders
Czech footballers
Czech people of Hungarian descent
Czech Republic youth international footballers
Czech Republic under-21 international footballers
AC Sparta Prague players
FK Teplice players
Czech First League players
SK Dynamo České Budějovice players
FC Saturn Ramenskoye players
FC Kuban Krasnodar players
FC Rostov players
Russian Premier League players
Czech expatriate footballers
Expatriate footballers in Russia
Czech expatriate sportspeople in Russia
Footballers at the 2000 Summer Olympics
Olympic footballers of the Czech Republic